Babbar ( also spelled as Babar, Babbarzai and Babbarani) is a Baloch tribe scattered across the Pakistani provinces of Sindh and Balochistan with a considerable population in the Rahim Yar Khan district and Dera Ghazi Khan division of Punjab. A small population of this tribe is also settled in Khalkhal, Gilan and Dalem regions of Iran. Some people of this tribe are also scattered across Ramsar region of  Mazandarin and Qazvin region of Qazvin province. Babbar is also a tribal name among Mazandarani Kurds.

Background 
The origin of this tribe is shrouded in mystery as it is always confused with the Babbar Khatri/Jat tribe of same name. It is present as a sub-tribe of Jamali tribe in Naseerabad, Sibi and Jaffarabad districts of Balochistan and Jacobabad district of Sindh.  In Noshki, Kalat and Surab districts of Balochistan, it is also present as a sub-tribe of Brahui speaking Mirwani Baloch tribe.This tribe  is mostly found as a sub-tribe of different Baloch tribes but it also has an independent status in some districts of Sindh and Punjab especially in Dera Ghazi Khan District. The people of this tribe speak Saraiki, Balochi, Brahui and Sindhi languages according to the area they inhabit.

According to the local tradition of Sindh and Makran, this tribe is descended from the larger Hoth Baloch tribe.

References

Baloch tribes
Sindh
Balochistan